Clyde Harold Smith (June 9, 1876 – April 8, 1940) was a United States representative from Maine.

Life and career
Born on a farm near Harmony, Maine, he moved with his parents to Hartland, Maine in 1891. He attended the rural schools and Hartland Academy, and taught school. Smith served in the Maine House of Representatives from 1899 to 1903 and from 1919 to 1923; he engaged in the retail clothing and hardware business in 1901, and was Hartland's superintendent of schools from 1903 to 1906.

From 1904 to 1907, he was a member of the Hartland board of selectmen, and moved to Skowhegan, Maine, having been elected sheriff of Somerset County, serving from 1905 to 1909. He engaged in the retail sale of automobiles and the hardware and plumbing business, as well as the newspaper publishing business in Skowhegan. He later engaged in banking and real estate. From 1914 to 1932, he was a member of the Skowhegan board of selectmen, and served in the Maine State Senate from 1923 to 1929 where he was an ardent opponent of the Ku Klux Klan that was at the time in its ascendency; he was chairman of the State highway commission from 1928 to 1932, and was a member of the Governor's council from 1933 to 1937.

Smith was elected as a Republican to the Seventy-fifth and Seventy-sixth Congresses, serving from January 3, 1937 until his death, in Washington, D.C., in April 1940. He was interred in Pine Grove Cemetery, Hartland, Maine.

Smith's wife, Margaret Chase Smith, was elected to fill the vacancy caused by his death and later went on to serve in the U.S. Senate.

See also

 List of United States Congress members who died in office (1900–49)

References

External links

1876 births
1940 deaths
People from Harmony, Maine
Republican Party members of the Maine House of Representatives
Republican Party Maine state senators
Businesspeople from Maine
Maine sheriffs
Republican Party members of the United States House of Representatives from Maine